Til I Die, Till I Die or Until I Die may refer to:

"'Til I Die" (The Beach Boys song), 1971
Til I Die (Potshots album), 2000
"Till I Die" (Chris Brown song), 2012
"Till I Die" (Machine Gun Kelly song), 2015
"Until I Die" (September song), 2007
"Till I Die", a 2021 song by Ken Carson from Project X
"Till I Die", a 2011 song by White Town from Monopole